Itakayt was an ancient Egyptian princess and queen of the 12th Dynasty, around 1800 BC. She is mainly known from her small pyramid next to the one of Senusret III at Dahshur. She had the titles king's daughter of his body, powerful, graceful and beloved.

The Pyramid
Her pyramid at the North side of the king's pyramid measured about 16.80 m at the base, and was once perhaps also 16.80 m high. It was built of mud bricks and covered with limestone slabs. In front of the pyramid was a small chapel decorated with reliefs. The remains of the reliefs preserved Itakayt's name.
Her burial chamber contained a sarcophagus, a canopic chest and two canopic jars.

Other sources
Itakayt is perhaps also known from a papyrus fragment found at Lahun. Here, family members of a king are listed, including Itakayt. It is uncertain to which king these members of a royal family are related. Senusret II seems to be most likely candidate, as the papyrus fragment was found at his funerary temple. This would make Itakayt a sister of Senusret III.

References

Princesses of the Twelfth Dynasty of Egypt
19th-century BC women